Lokotrans Aréna is a multi-purpose stadium in Mladá Boleslav, Czech Republic.  It is currently used mostly for football matches and is the home ground of FK Mladá Boleslav. The stadium holds 5,000 people. The stadium was known as Městský stadion Mladá Boleslav until July 2019, when it was renamed for sponsorship reasons to Lokotrans Aréna.

International matches
Městský stadion has hosted two friendly matches of the Czech Republic national football team.

References

External links
Photo gallery and data at Erlebnis-Stadion.de
Info at FK Mladá Boleslav website 

Football venues in the Czech Republic
Football venues in Czechoslovakia
Athletics (track and field) venues in Czechoslovakia
Czech First League venues
Multi-purpose stadiums in the Czech Republic
FK Mladá Boleslav
Buildings and structures in Mladá Boleslav
Sport in Mladá Boleslav
1965 establishments in Czechoslovakia
Sports venues completed in 1965
20th-century architecture in the Czech Republic